Olena Oleksandrivna Voronina (born 5 May 1990) is a Ukrainian sabre fencer. She is the 2013 World team champion, 2015 European individual bronze medalist, and 2016 Olympic team silver medalist.

Life and career 
Voronina won a gold medal in the women's team sabre at the 2013 World Fencing Championships. She and the Ukrainian team won bronze in 2014 and silver in 2015.

At the 2016 Summer Olympics in Rio, Voronina won the silver medal with team members Olha Kharlan, Alina Komashchuk, and Olena Kravatska.

Voronina lives in Kharkiv, Ukraine. She is a student at the Kharkiv Polytechnic Institute.

References

External links
 Rankings

1990 births
Living people
Ukrainian female sabre fencers
Sportspeople from Kharkiv
Olympic fencers of Ukraine
Fencers at the 2016 Summer Olympics
Medalists at the 2016 Summer Olympics
Olympic silver medalists for Ukraine
Olympic medalists in fencing
Universiade medalists in fencing
Universiade gold medalists for Ukraine
Medalists at the 2009 Summer Universiade
20th-century Ukrainian women
21st-century Ukrainian women